Alestopetersius smykalai is a species of African tetras found in the lower Niger River.

Etymology
The tetra is named in honor of E. R. Smykala, who collected the type specimen.

References

Paugy, D., 1990. Characidae. p. 195-236. In C. Lévêque, D. Paugy and G.G. Teugels (eds.) Faune des poissons d'eaux douces et saumâtres de l'Afrique de l'Ouest. Tome I. Coll. Faune Tropicale n° XXVIII. Musée Royal de l'Afrique Centrale, Tervuren et O.R.S.T.O.M., Paris, 384 p.

Alestidae
Fish of Africa
Taxa named by Max Poll
Fish described in 1967